52nd district of Czech senate is based in Pelhřimov. The Seat is currently held by Milan Štěch.

Senators

Election results

1996 election

2002 election

2008 election

2014 election

2020 election

References

15